The Jersey national cricket team is the team that represents the Bailiwick of Jersey, a Crown dependency in international cricket. They became an affiliate member of the International Cricket Council (ICC) in 2005, and an associate member in 2007.

History
Jersey first played international cricket against neighbouring Channel Island of Guernsey in the inaugural annual Inter-insular match in 1950. They won ten of the matches in a row between 1992 and 2001, before a run of five consecutive victories for Guernsey until 2006.

Jersey became an affiliate member of the ICC in 2005, and took part in Division Two of the European Championship in Scotland in 2006, losing to Norway in the final. The following March, they beat Italy in a three match series that they had to win to be promoted to associate membership of the ICC. They were granted associate status at an ICC meeting at Lord's in June.

In August, Jersey won the inter-insular by 4 runs to end Guernsey's run of wins, but lost the first inter-insular Twenty20 match in September by five wickets.

 2008, Jersey hosted Division Five of the World Cricket League in May. Jersey performed well and topped Group B after the group qualifying matches. Jersey then beat the United States in their semi-final before losing the final to Afghanistan. As Division Five runners-up, Jersey were promoted to Division Four of the World Cricket League.
 2008, Jersey travelled to neighbours Guernsey in August to take part in Division Two of the European Championship against; Croatia, France, Germany, Gibraltar and Guernsey. Jersey improved on their 2006 performance, edging out Guernsey by one run in the final group match to win the tournament undefeated.
 2008, Jersey travelled to Tanzania in October to participate in Division Four of the World Cricket League. Division Four proved to be a step too far for Jersey, as with a series of poor batting displays Jersey won only one group match, before losing to Fiji in a positional playoff and finishing sixth. On the basis of their sixth-place finish in this tournament, Jersey were relegated back to Division Five.
 2010 ICC World Cricket League Division Five in Nepal, they finished 5th to be relegated to 2011 ICC World Cricket League Division Six in Malaysia, where they finished 4th to remain in Division Six. 
 2011 ICC European T20 Championship Division One, hosted by Jersey, losing to Italy in semi-final.
 2013 ICC European T20 Championship Division One, Jersey losing to Italy in semi-final.
 2013 ICC World Cricket League Division Six, Jersey remained unbeaten in their 5 games, going on to win and gain promotion to WCL5 
 2014 ICC World Cricket League Division Five was held in March in Malaysia. Jersey were again unbeaten and gained promotion to WCL4. 
 2014 ICC World Cricket League Division Four matches, saw Jersey win only one of their 5 matches in the round robin and relegation back to WCL5.
 2015 ICC Europe Division One competition saw Jersey come out on top and win entry into the ICC World Twenty20 Qualifier.
 2015 ICC World Twenty20 Qualifier held in Scotland and Ireland in July saw Jersey end in 6th place in Group A, 11th overall.
 2016 ICC World Cricket League Division Five competition saw an improved result winning four out of five and promotion back to WCL4 
 2016 ICC World Cricket League Division Four competition took place in Los Angeles. Two wins was not sufficient, demoted to WCL5

2018-Present
In April 2018, the ICC decided to grant full Twenty20 International (T20I) status to all its members. Therefore, all Twenty20 matches played between Jersey and other ICC members after 1 January 2019 will be a full T20I. 

In September 2018, Jersey qualified from Group B of the 2018–19 ICC World Twenty20 Europe Qualifier to the Regional Finals of the tournament.

Jersey played their first T20I against Guernsey on 31 May 2019.

Grounds

Tournament history

World Cricket League
2008: Division Five Runner-up - promoted
2008: Division Four Sixth place - relegated
2010: Division Five Fifth place - relegated
2011: Division Six Fourth place
2013: Division Six Winner - promoted
2014: Division Five Winner - promoted
2014: Division Four Sixth place - relegated
2016: Division Five Winner - promoted
2016: Division Four Fifth place - relegated
2018: Division Four Fourth place

European Cricket Championship
1996 to 2004 inclusive: Not eligible, not an ICC member
2006: Division Two Runner-up
2008: Division Two Winner - promoted
2010: Division One Winner 
2011: Division One Third place
2013: Division One Semi-Finals
2015: Division One Winner

World T20 Qualifier
2015: 11th place
2019: 10th place
2022 (Qualifier B): 7th place

Records and Statistics

International Match Summary — Jersey
 
Last updated 17 July 2022

Twenty20 International 
 Highest team total: 185/7 v Guernsey on 21 May 2022 at King George V Sports Ground, Castel.
 Highest individual score: 96*, Jonty Jenner v Denmark on 21 October 2021 at Desert Springs Cricket Ground, Almería.  
 Best individual bowling figures: 5/17, Charles Perchard v Guernsey on 1 June 2019 at King George V Sports Ground, Castel.

Most T20I runs for Jersey

Most T20I wickets for Jersey

T20I record versus other nations

Records complete to T20I #1666. Last updated 17 July 2022.

Squad
This lists all the players who were named in the most recent One-day or T20I squad. Updated as of 17 July 2022.

Notable players
Four players have played for Jersey and at first-class level for another team (or teams):
 Corne Bodenstein – debuted for Jersey in 2011, also played for Oxford MCC University
 Ryan Driver – played for Jersey between 2005 and 2011, and earlier for Cornwall, Lancashire, and Worcestershire
 Albert Geary – played for Jersey between 1932 and 1940, and earlier for Surrey
 Jonty Jenner - debuted for Jersey in from 2014, also played for Sussex, played as substitute fielder for Stuart Broad during the first Test between England and South Africa.
 Nathaniel Watkins – debuted for Jersey in 2012, also played for Oxfordshire and Durham MCC University

Several other first-class players were born on the island, including:

 Arthur Coode – first-class matches for Cambridge University, Middlesex, and the MCC
 Robert Copland-Crawford – first-class matches for the MCC and North of England, football for Scotland
 Herbert Lyon – first-class matches for Oxford University
 Robert Osborne-Smith – one first-class match for the Indian Army

See also
 List of Jersey Twenty20 International cricketers

References

External links
Official Website 
Cricket Europe-Jersey
Cricinfo Jersey

Cricket in Jersey
National cricket teams
Cricket
Jersey in international cricket